Acleris cameroonana is a species of moth of the family Tortricidae. It was described by Józef Razowski in 2012 and is endemic to Cameroon.

The ground colour of the forewings is cream forming a large basal blotch suffused brown along the costa. The remaining part of wing is greyish brown, but darker towards the basal area. The hindwings are cream, brownish from the middle and darkening on the periphery.

Etymology
The species name refers to the type locality.

References

External links

Endemic fauna of Cameroon
Moths described in 2012
cameroonana
Insects of Cameroon
Moths of Africa
Taxa named by Józef Razowski